The 1996 Czech Republic motorcycle Grand Prix was the eleventh round of the 1996 Grand Prix motorcycle racing season. It took place on 18 August 1996 at the Masaryk Circuit located in Brno, Czech Republic. It was also the first victory for a young Valentino Rossi in the 125cc class.

500 cc classification

250 cc classification

References

Czech Republic motorcycle Grand Prix
Czech Republic
Motorcycle Grand Prix